Ohio's 33rd senatorial district has historically been based in the Mahoning Valley.  It now consists of the counties of Columbiana and Mahoning. It encompasses Ohio House of Representatives districts 5, 58 and 59.  It has a Cook PVI of D+12.  The district was represented by the Senate President from 1983 to 1984 with Senator Harry Meshel.  Its current Ohio Senator is Republican Michael Rulli.  He resides in Salem, a city located in Columbiana and Mahoning counties.

List of senators

External links
Ohio's 33rd district senator at the 133rd Ohio General Assembly official website

Ohio State Senate districts